= Medicines and Medical Devices Agency of Serbia =

- Агенција за лекове и медицинска средства Agencija za lekove i medicinska sredstva

Agency overview
- Formed: 1 October 2004; 21 years ago
- Headquarters: Belgrade, Serbia
- Agency executive: Saša Jaćović, Acting Director
- Website: www.alims.gov.rs/en

The Medicines and Medical Devices Agency of Serbia (Serbian: Агенција за лекове и медицинска средства, romanized: Agencija za lekove i medicinska sredstva; abbr. ALIMS) is a Serbian national authority responsible for regulation and surveillance of the development, manufacturing and sale of human and veterinary drugs and medical devices. Its task is also to ensure that both individual patients and healthcare professionals have access to safe and effective medicinal products.

Medicines and Medical Devices Agency of Serbia was founded by the Serbian Law on Medicines and Medical Devices in 2004, thus replacing previously existing Medicines Bureau of Yugoslavia (established in 1948) and Institute for testing and control of medicines of Serbia (established in 1960).

The Medicines and Medical Devices Agency of Serbia is a government body under the aegis of the Serbian Ministry of Health. Its operations are largely financed through fees. Approximately 180 people work at the agency; most are pharmacists and doctors.

== See also ==
- Regulation of therapeutic goods
- European Medicines Agency
